Vladimir Vladimirovich Mazov (born 8 March 1981) is a Russian former professional footballer.

Club career
He made his debut in the Russian Premier League in 2005 for FC Tom Tomsk.

References

1981 births
Living people
Sportspeople from Tula, Russia
Russian footballers
FC Tom Tomsk players
FC Khimki players
FC Spartak Vladikavkaz players
FC Salyut Belgorod players
Russian Premier League players
FC Arsenal Tula players
Association football defenders
FC Tyumen players
FC Neftekhimik Nizhnekamsk players
FC Oryol players
FC MVD Rossii Moscow players